Aghul is a Northeast Caucasian language spoken by the Aghuls in southern Dagestan, Russia and in Azerbaijan. It is spoken by about 29,300 people (2010 census).

Classification
Aghul belongs to the Eastern Samur group of the Lezgic branch of the Northeast Caucasian language family.

Geographic distribution
In 2002, Aghul was spoken by 28,300 people in Russia, mainly in Southern Dagestan, as well as 32 people in Azerbaijan.

Related languages
There are nine languages in the Lezgian language family, namely: Aghul, Tabasaran, Rutul, Lezgian, Tsakhur, Budukh, Kryts, Udi and Archi.

Phonology
Aghul has contrastive epiglottal consonants.
Aghul makes, like many Northeast Caucasian languages, a distinction between tense consonants with concomitant length and weak consonants. The tense consonants are characterized by the intensiveness (tension) of articulation, which naturally leads to a lengthening of the consonant so they are traditionally transcribed with the length diacritic. The gemination of the consonant itself does not create its tension, but morphologically tense consonants often derive from adjoining two single weak consonants. Some Aghul dialects have an especially large number of permitted initial tense consonants.

Vowels

Consonants 

 The glottal stop transcribed here is named rather ambiguously a "glottalic laryngeal" by the source.

Alphabet

Grammar

Case
There are four core cases: absolutive, ergative, genitive, and dative, as well as a large series of location cases. All cases other than the absolutive (which is unmarked) and ergative take the ergative suffix before their own suffix.

Adjectives
Independent and predicative adjectives take number marker and class marker; also case if used as nominal. As attribute they are invariable.  Thus idžed "good", ergative, idžedi, etc. -n, -s; pl. idžedar; but Idže insandi hhuč qini "The good man killed the wolf" (subject in ergative case).

Pronouns

Personal pronouns

Vocabulary

Writing system

Examples

References

Bibliography
 Haspelmath, Martin. 1993. A grammar of Lezgian. (Mouton grammar library; 9). Berlin & New York: Mouton de Gruyter. – 
 
 Talibov, Bukar B. and Magomed M. Gadžiev. 1966. Lezginsko-russkij slovar’. Moskva: Izd. Sovetskaja Ėnciklopedija.

External links

 Languages of the World report 
 UCLA phonetics lab data for Aghul
 Aghul word lists from the UCLA phonetics lab archive
 Aghul basic lexicon at the Global Lexicostatistical Database

Northeast Caucasian languages
Languages of Azerbaijan
Languages of Russia
Endangered Caucasian languages
Languages written in Cyrillic script
Turkic languages